= S. P. Natsarenus =

S. P. Natsarenus (1883–1938) was a Russian Bolshevik military officer. He was Military Commissar Extraordinary for the Murmansk-White Sea Territory in 1918, later Military Commissar for the Petrograd Military District. He was also at various times a member of the Revolutionary Military Councils of the 7th, 14th and 15th armies. He was arrested during the Great Purge, and executed January 8, 1938. He posthumously was rehabilitated in 1956.
